Calumet River Railway may refer to:
Calumet River Railway (Illinois), 1883–1901, predecessor of the Pennsylvania Railroad
Calumet River Railway (Indiana), 1886–1887, predecessor of the Baltimore and Ohio Chicago Terminal Railroad